Kline Gilbert (November 22, 1930June 1987) was a professional American football offensive tackle in the National Football League. He played five seasons for the Chicago Bears (1953–1957).

References

1930 births
1987 deaths
American football offensive tackles
Chicago Bears players
Ole Miss Rebels football players
People from Washington County, Mississippi
Players of American football from Mississippi
Western Conference Pro Bowl players